EMPA is a selective antagonist of the OX2 receptor, with 900-fold selectivity in binding for OX2 over OX1.

See also 
 TCS-OX2-29

References 

Orexin antagonists
Pyridines
Sulfonamides